Dunhampstead railway station served the village of Dunhampstead, Worcestershire, England, from 1841 to 1855 on the Birmingham and Gloucester Railway.

History 
The station was opened in November 1841 by the Birmingham and Gloucester Railway. It closed on 1 October 1855.

References 

Disused railway stations in Worcestershire
Railway stations in Great Britain opened in 1841
Railway stations in Great Britain closed in 1855
1841 establishments in England
1855 disestablishments in England